The Kantaka barb (Osteochilichthys brevidorsalis) is a species of cyprinid fish endemic to the Western Ghats, India. It inhabits large streams, and grows to  TL.

References

Cyprinid fish of Asia
Freshwater fish of India
Endemic fauna of the Western Ghats
Fish described in 1873
Osteochilichthys